Groundswell is a 501(c)3 nonprofit that builds community power through equitable community solar projects and resilience centers, clean energy programs that reduce energy burdens, and pioneering research initiatives that help light the way to clean energy futures for all. Groundswell leads clean energy programs and projects in six states including the District of Columbia,  including serving more than 3,700 income-qualified customers with more than $1.85 million per year in clean energy savings. Today, across the U.S., the poorest 20% of Americans are paying 10% or more of their total income for electricity and more than half of America can’t access solar.

According to the organization's annual report, since its founding in 2009, Groundswell's work has resulted in the procurement of more than 180 million kilowatt-hours of clean energy for nearly 4,000 families and small businesses and reduced greenhouse gas emissions equivalent to taking 27,500 cars off the road.

History
Groundswell was founded in 2009 by a group of field organizers who had previously worked together on the 2008 Barack Obama Presidential Campaign. Groundswell co-founder Will Byrne served as the organization's CEO through 2014. The organization operated under two previous names, The DC Project and Weatherize DC, before becoming Groundswell. Groundswell chose Washington, D.C. as its hub because it is one of a small but growing number of places where residents are able to choose their energy suppliers.

Since then, Groundswell has grown to serve the Mid Atlantic region including Georgia, Maryland, North Carolina, New York and Illinois. It is led by CEO Michelle Moore, a social enterprise entrepreneur and former White House official who helped build the global sustainability movement.

Launched in November 2015, Groundswell’s community solar programs enable neighbors to share power, cutting electricity bills in half for low to moderate-income households. Groundswell currently has more than 3 MW of projects in development in Washington DC and MD. In addition, Groundswell has implemented education-focused demonstration projects in Illinois, North Carolina, and Georgia with corporate sponsors.

Clean energy
Groundswell develops community solar projects and programs that connect solar power with economic empowerment, enabling people and community-based businesses to work together to switch to solar energy.

Groundswell works with other non-profit organizations to reach out to economically diverse local communities.

Groundswell’s SharePower subscription model was designed to help neighbors share power with neighbors. When subscribers join Groundswell, their subscription makes solar savings available to low-income neighbors who struggle with the burden of high energy bills.  Under SharePower, for every 3–5 households who subscribe to a Groundswell community solar project, an Empowered household is enrolled at no cost and is able to cut their electricity bill by about 50%.

See also
Civic consumption
Social enterprise

References

External links

2009 establishments in the United States
Non-profit organizations based in Washington, D.C.